Liu Dun ( 190s – 220s), courtesy name Ziren, was an official serving under the warlord Sun Quan during the late Eastern Han dynasty and early Three Kingdoms period of China.

Life
Liu Dun's ancestral home was Pingyuan (平原). During the chaos of the end of the Han dynasty, he fled across the Yangzi to Luling (廬陵) where he was invited to the staff of its administrator Sun Fu, cousin and general to the warlord Sun Quan. Liu Dun was skilled in divination with an expertise in astrology, he became famed in the south for it, predicting floods, droughts and uprisings. Sun Fu was impressed by Liu Dun's predictions, using him to help find the hiding places of local rebels  and appointed him as his Military Advisor (軍師 junshi), while among the army itself he became popularly known by the nickname Shenming (神明 "Divine Brilliance").

Liu Dun later served under Sun Quan directly. In 204, Sun Quan was at Yuzhang, having remained there on his return from a campaign against Huang Zu the year before and became worried by a change in stars. Liu Dun warned there would be trouble in Danyang, a betrayal which was deemed to be foreseeing the assassination of Sun Quan's younger brother Sun Yi, the Administrator of Danyang, by Bian Hong (邊鴻).

Liu Dun was also the author of a now-lost tome of his art in a hundred volumes, which was praised by the scholar Diao Xuan (刁玄). However, Liu Dun was also noted for being secretive of his arts and declining to share it with others, resulting in his work becoming increasingly difficult for subsequent generations to understand.

See also
 Lists of people of the Three Kingdoms

References

 Chen, Shou (3rd century). Records of the Three Kingdoms (Sanguozhi). Scroll 63.
 Pei, Songzhi (5th century). Annotations to Records of the Three Kingdoms (Sanguozhi zhu).  Scroll 63.
 

Chinese astrologers
Officials under Sun Quan
People during the end of the Han dynasty
Sun Quan and associates